"The Sound" is a  science fiction short story by Canadian-American writer A. E. van Vogt, originally published in Astounding in February 1950. In contrast to his earlier short stories, "The Sound" has a distinctly Red Scare feel to it. It involves the alien Yevd who can take on any form, and a young boy that thwarts their effort to infiltrate a naval spaceship yard.

Plot summary
After many years of warfare with the alien Yevd, mankind is on the verge of completing The Ship. The Yevd are aware of this, and have tried to infiltrate the shipyard in Solar City where it is being built. Humans have kept the Yved out by spraying tailored microbes into the air around the yard.

The Yved use light to communicate, and these organs can also be used to cloak their bodies in a shapeshifting fashion, or when applied in a burst, used as a weapon. As they do not use sound for communication they lack anything equivalent to ears, so to communicate with humans they use small translator boxes that are not very sensitive and cannot pick up whispers.

Diddy, a nine-year-old boy, is on his first hunt for The Sound, a mysterious humming that can be heard for miles around the yards. Finding the source of The Sound has become a sort of treasure hunt for young boys. Diddy is younger than most for his first hunt.

As he begins to explore the yard he is approached by a policeman that he immediately realizes is a Yved spy. The Yved tells him that he is worried that the bacterial defense system has become stale and will no longer work. He asks Diddy to cross into the yard and then return. When he does, the policeman takes a sample of his blood. After a quick test, the Yved crosses into the yard. Several more Yved join Diddy, disguised as boys on the hunt.

As they explore the yard, they are approached by a young woman. She offers to tell them each a secret that will help them find The Sound. She whispers to Diddy that they have a plan to attack Yved. She tells him there is a gun hidden below a girder in a nearby building that he should retrieve while pretending to look for The Sound. He retrieves the gun and is then given further instructions through a low-volume speaker.

It is explained the Yved cannot use their light communications system in the presence of fluorine, and that they have filled nearby buildings with this gas. Diddy is told to enter a nearby building and shoot everyone, they are all Yved spies. Diddy enters and begins shooting, and when the Yved attempt to return fire, they burst into flame. He moves from room to room until the building is cleared.

With the threat ended, Diddy is allowed to leave. He joins a crowd of other boys watching the sun rise after a night of hunting for The Sound. Discussing it with another boy, Mart, they both realize they have found The Sound. It is the all-pervasive siren song of the entire shipyard put together.

References

1950 short stories
Science fiction short stories
Short stories by A. E. van Vogt